Mikko Viitikko (born 18 April 1995) is a Finnish professional footballer who plays for Swedish club Trelleborg, as a defender.

Club career
Viitikko comes from the youth academies of HJK Helsinki. HJK promoted Viitikko to their reserve team Klubi 04 for the 2011 season.

Viitikko made his first appearance in Veikkausliiga on 2 August 2014, paying for HJK in a 1–0 victory against Myllykosken Pallo-47 . He was included in the starting eleven in that match and played full 90 minutes.

In November 2014, Viitikko signed a two-and-a-half year contract with Vaasan Palloseura.

In 2018, Viitikko signed for Norwegian club Fredrikstad FK. After a year in Norway, Viitikko came back to Finland to play for Lahti.

On 4 February 2022, Viitikko signed a contract with Trelleborg in Sweden until 2025.

References

1995 births
Footballers from Helsinki
Living people
Finnish footballers
Klubi 04 players
Helsingin Jalkapalloklubi players
Vaasan Palloseura players
Fredrikstad FK players
FC Lahti players
Trelleborgs FF players
Kakkonen players
Veikkausliiga players
Norwegian Second Division players
Association football defenders
Finnish expatriate footballers
Finnish expatriate sportspeople in Norway
Expatriate footballers in Norway
Finnish expatriate sportspeople in Sweden
Expatriate footballers in Sweden